Saint-Bonnet-Laval is a commune in the department of Lozère, southern France. The municipality was established on 1 January 2017 by merger of the former communes of Saint-Bonnet-de-Montauroux (the seat) and Laval-Atger.

See also 
Communes of the Lozère department

References 

Communes of Lozère